T. G. Mohandas (born 1955) is an Indian lawyer.

social critic, writer, journalist and television presenter from Kerala. Mohandas was the state convener of Bharatiya Janata Party's Intellectual Cell and the General Secretary in 1997 of Bharateeya Vichara Kendram and its vice-president in 2006 and served also as General Manager of Ayodhya Printers, a company owned by the Rashtriya Swayamsevak Sangh (RSS).

Ideology 
He came into contact with the RSS from childhood and still continues to be a strong proponent of Hindutva ideology in Kerala. Mohandas serves as the state convener of Bharatiya Janata Party's Intellectual Cell. Mohandas was the General Manager of the newspaper Janmabhumi for a brief period.

Legal battles 
 He has filed several Public interest litigation cases in Kerala High Court, including his challenge to Government of Kerala decision to donate Rs.5 crore for flood relief in Pakistan.
 T. G. Mohandas filed a writ petition in the Kerala High Court in November 2015, demanding that the provisions of the Travancore Cochin Religious Institution Act, 1950 be declared unconstitutional.
 He filed a petition in Magistrate Court in Ernakulam in February 2017, seeking an effective probe into the case registered in 2013 on the alleged conspiracy to kill P. Parameswaran by Abdul Nazer Mahdani, an Islamic fundamentalist in Kerala . The case was registered by Ernakulam Central police station on his petition to magistrate court and the probe was handed over to Crime Branch. Because of the failure of Kerala police to conduct a proper investigation, he has approached the Kerala HC for an inquiry by CBI and the case is pending.
 He filed a petition in Kerala High Court that had sought a ban on non-Hindus entering the Sabarimala temple and the court rejected the petition by saying the petition was likely to disturb the secular fabric of society.

Works 
T. G. Mohandas has authored several articles on Indian philosophy, politics and society. His works continuously published in weeklies like Kesari
, Kalakaumudi, Organiser and news-dailies like Mathrubhumi, Mangalam, Kerala Kaumudi, Janmabhumi etc. He actively participates in news channel debates representing Bharatiya Janata Party.

On Janam TV, he hosts the TV program—Polichezhuthu at every saturday 8.30Pm IST

Controversies
 T. G. Mohandas wrote an article in the Sangh Parivar publication Kesari, about the alliance with bitter political rival of Sangh Parivar. But this article sparked some controversy in both side.

Awards 
In 2017, his TV Program in Janam TV Polichezhuthu received Tenth Thikkurissy Foundation award in the category of Best Social Criticism Program.

See also 
David Frawley
Koenraad Elst
P. Parameswaran
Kummanam Rajasekharan

References

External links 
T.G.Mohandas vs Cochin Devaswom Board
T.G.Mohandas vs Union Of India on 31 July, 2012

1955 births
Living people
20th-century Indian philosophers
People from Alappuzha district
Rashtriya Swayamsevak Sangh members
Indian television presenters
Indian political philosophers
21st-century Indian lawyers